Miracle Mile is a 1988 American apocalyptic thriller film written and directed by Steve De Jarnatt, and starring Anthony Edwards and Mare Winningham. The film depicts the panic surrounding a supposed doomsday brought on by a sudden outbreak of war and its oncoming nuclear holocaust. Both the period and nighttime setting leave characters and the audience uncertain as to whether or not the doomsday claims hold any authenticity. The film takes place in a single day, and mostly in real-time. It is titled after the Miracle Mile neighborhood of Los Angeles, where most of the events takes place.

Plot
Harry Washello and Julie Peters meet at the La Brea Tar Pits and immediately fall in love. They spend the afternoon together, and arrange to meet at midnight after her shift at a local coffee shop. However, due to a power failure, Harry's alarm does not go off and Julie leaves for home. When Harry awakes that night he realizes what has happened and rushes to the shop, arriving at 4 AM. Harry tries to call Julie on a payphone, but only reaches her answering machine, where he leaves an apology. The phone rings as soon as the previous call ends and Harry answers, hearing a frantic man named Chip urgently warning that war will break out in less than seventy minutes. When Harry asks who is calling, Chip realizes that he has dialed the wrong area code. He pleads with Harry to call his father and apologize for some past wrong before he is interrupted and presumably shot dead. An unfamiliar voice picks up the phone and tells Harry to forget everything he heard and "go back to sleep" before disconnecting.

Harry, confused and not entirely convinced of the authenticity of the information, wanders back into the diner and tells the other customers what he has heard. As the patrons scoff at his story, one of them, a businesswoman named Landa, places calls to politicians in Washington and finds that they are all suddenly heading for "the extreme Southern Hemisphere". She verifies that the launch codes Chip mentioned are real and, convinced of the danger, immediately charters private jets out of Los Angeles International Airport to a compound in a region in Antarctica with no rainfall. Most of the customers and staff leave with her in the owner's delivery van. When the owner refuses to make any stops, Harry, unwilling to leave without Julie, arranges to meet the group at the airport and jumps from the truck.

Harry is helped and hindered by various strangers, who are initially unaware of the impending apocalypse. In the process he inadvertently causes several deaths and is deeply shaken by that, yet still he goes on. When he finds Julie and tells her what is happening, she notes that there is no confirmation of the attack. Desperate to reach the airport and not having a car, Harry finds a helicopter pilot and tells him to meet them on the roof of the Mutual Benefit Life Building, where Landa ordered a helicopter and a large amount of supplies to be delivered. Julie has also tried to find a pilot on her own, and in the moments it takes to find her, Los Angeles descends into violent chaos. There is still no confirmation any of this is real, and Harry wonders if he has sparked a massive false panic in the example of Chicken Little. However, when he uses a phone booth to contact Chip's father, he reaches a man who says his son is a soldier. Harry tries to pass on the message he was given, but the man hangs up before Harry finishes.

When they reach the top of the Mutual Benefit building they find the pad empty, with only Landa's drunk co-worker on the roof. Any doubts about a false alarm are eliminated when a missile can be seen streaking across the sky. As they fear the end, the helicopter suddenly returns with the pilot badly wounded but fulfilling his promise to come back for them. After they lift off from the roof, several warheads hit and the nuclear electromagnetic pulse from the detonations causes the helicopter to crash into the La Brea pits. As the helicopter sinks and the cabin fills with natural asphalt tar, Harry tries to comfort a hysterical Julie by saying someday their fossils will be found and they will probably be put in a museum, or maybe they will take a direct hit and be turned into diamonds. Julie, accepting her fate, calms down and takes comfort in Harry's words, and the movie fades out as the tar fills the compartment. A final explosion seems to imply a direct hit has taken place.

Cast

 Anthony Edwards as Harry Washello
 Mare Winningham as Julie Peters
 John Agar as Ivan Peters
 Lou Hancock as Lucy Peters
 Mykelti Williamson as Wilson
 Kelly Jo Minter as Charlotta
 Kurt Fuller as Gerstead
 Brian Thompson as Helicopter Pilot
 Denise Crosby as Landa
 Robert DoQui as Fred the Cook
 O-Lan Jones as Susie the Waitress
 Claude Earl Jones as Harlan
 Alan Rosenberg as Mike
 Danny De La Paz as Roger the Transvestite
 Earl Boen as Drunk Man in Diner
 Raphael Sbarge as Chip
 Lucille Bliss as Old Woman in Diner 
 Diane Delano as Stewardess
 Edward Bunker as Nightwatchman
 Peter Berg as Band Member
 Richard Biggs as Brian Jones
 Jenette Goldstein as Beverly Hills Chick #1

Production
Before Miracle Mile was made, its production had been legendary in Hollywood for ten years. In 1983, it had been chosen by American Film magazine as one of the ten best unmade screenplays. Steve De Jarnatt wrote it just out of the American Film Institute for Warner Brothers with the hope of directing it as well. The studio wanted to make it on a bigger scale and did not want to entrust the project with a first-time director like De Jarnatt.

Miracle Mile spent three years in production limbo until De Jarnatt optioned it himself, buying the script for $25,000. He rewrote it and the studio offered him $400,000 to buy it back. He turned them down. When he shopped it around to other studios, they balked at the mix of romance and nuclear war and the film's downbeat ending. At one point, it nearly became the script for the eventual separately made Twilight Zone: The Movie. Before Anthony Edwards was cast, production nearly began with both Nicolas Cage and Kurt Russell. Of the script, Edwards said, "It scared the hell out of me. It really made me angry too ... I just couldn't believe that somebody had written this." John Daly of Hemdale Films gave De Jarnatt $3.7 million to make the film.

Edwards later recalled:

That was a script that everybody wanted to make, but they wanted him to change the ending. It was this great adventure, but they wanted it to have a happy ending. But he stuck it out, and luckily he stuck it out long enough that I was old enough to play the part. [Laughs.]  So I got to do it, and we did it at a time when there really was no green screen for special effects. You had to shoot what was there. It's amazing how dated that film looks now, because of our ability to do things technically now. I mean, it really looks antiquated. Mare Winningham is one of the greatest actresses ever. It was eight weeks of night shooting, though, so you'd be driving home from work at, like, 6 in the morning, having had a wrap beer, and then you're suddenly going, "Oh my God, what do people think of somebody having a beer at 6 in the morning whenever everyone else is on their way to work? [Laughs.]The following locations in Los Angeles were used: Johnie's Coffee Shop; La Brea Tar Pits; Miracle Mile District; Pan-Pacific Auditorium in the  Fairfax District.

Soundtrack

Miracle Mile is the thirty-sixth major release and twelfth soundtrack album by Tangerine Dream. Monty Smith in Q Magazine described it as an "euphonious mixture of gloomy melodic synthesizers and hypnotically insistent drum machines".

Track listing

Personnel
 Edgar Froese
 Paul Haslinger

2017 release
The complete score in film sequence order was released in 2017 representing the score as delivered by Tangerine Dream to the director, essentially as heard in the film’s mix with tracks 14 through 23 containing music effects.

Track listing
CD1: The Complete Film Score

CD2: The Soundtrack Album

Personnel
 Edgar Froese
 Paul Haslinger

Reception
Miracle Mile received generally positive reviews among critics. The review aggregator Rotten Tomatoes reported that 91% of critics gave the film a positive review, based on 32 reviews and the consensus: "Miracle Mile brings about its small-scale doomsday tale with achingly rich bleakness and hypnotically nightmarish fervor."

Roger Ebert praised the film, claiming it had a "diabolical effectiveness" and a sense of "real terror". In her review for the Washington Post, Rita Kempley wrote: "It seems [De Jarnatt]'s not committed to his story or his characters, but to the idea that he is saying something profound—which he isn't." Stephen Holden, in The New York Times, wrote: "As Harry and Julie, Mr. Edwards and Ms. Winningham make an unusually refreshing pair." In his review for the Boston Globe, Jay Carr called it: "... a messy film, but it's got energy, urgency, conviction and heat and you won't soon forget it." British film and television critic Charlie Brooker, in an article for the BAFTA web site written in September 2008, awarded Miracle Mile the honor of having the "Biggest Lurch of Tone" of any film he had ever seen.

Awards
Wins:
 Sitges - Catalan International Film Festival: Best Special Effects; 1989.
 Saturn Award: Saturn Award for Best Classic Film DVD Release; 2016.

Nominations:
Sitges - Catalan International Film Festival: Nominated, Best Film, Steve De Jarnatt; 1989
Sundance Film Festival: Grand Jury Prize, Dramatic, Steve De Jarnatt; 1989.
Independent Spirit Awards: Best Screenplay, Steve De Jarnatt; Best Supporting Female, Mare Winningham; 1990.

See also
 List of apocalyptic films
 List of films about nuclear issues
 List of nuclear holocaust fiction
 Nuclear weapons in popular culture
 Survival film

References

External links
 
 
 
 
 Miracle Mile soundtrack sample by Tangerine Dream at YouTube
 Miracle Mile film trailer at YouTube

1988 films
1988 independent films
1988 romantic drama films
1988 thriller films
1980s disaster films
American disaster films
American political thriller films
American romantic drama films
Apocalyptic films
Films about nuclear war and weapons
Films scored by Tangerine Dream
Films set in Los Angeles
Films about World War III
1980s English-language films
1980s American films